Masters of Venus is a 1962 British science fiction film serial in 8 parts, made by the Children's Film Foundation for cinema distribution as a Saturday morning serial for children. It's directed by Ernest Morris, and stars Norman Wooland, Mandy Harper and Robin Stewart. It was made in black-and-white.

The screenplay concerns two children who are accidentally launched into space in a rocket  built by their father, and land on the planet Venus. It was distributed as a weekly serial for Saturday morning cinema clubs, presented in eight 16-minute parts, each of which ends on a cliffhanger. The complete serial has a running time of 133 minutes (2 hours 13 minutes).

In the 1950s and 1960s this type of serial was common, as a 'B' feature shown before the intermission, which was followed by a full-length feature film. Many such serials were made, by the Children's Film Foundation among others.

Synopsis
The rocket Astarte is prematurely fired into space by Venusian saboteurs. On board are two children. When the rocket ends up on Venus, they experience a sequence of Flash Gordon style adventures, in a civilisation which consists of the super-advanced survivors of Atlantis. Ultimately, by their intervention, war between Earth and Venus is averted. Suspense is built up quite well in the early instalments, thanks to the mystery surrounding the motives of the saboteurs, and also because the rocket doesn't actually reach Venus until part 4.

Production
Within the overall title of Masters of Venus, each of the eight parts also had an individual chapter title.

One of the regular characters, the Venusian girl Sunia (or Marla, according to other sources), was played by the 16-year-old Zienia Merton, who later in her career would appear on television with William Hartnell in Doctor Who (in the 1964 serial Marco Polo), and with Martin Landau and Barbara Bain in Gerry Anderson's sci-fi series Space:1999 (1975–77), as series regular Sandra Benes.

The plot revolved around two types of Venusians, a group of five-fingered ones and a group of six-fingered ones. All the actors playing the latter had to wear gloves, to simulate 6 fingers, and as a pair could not be found small enough for Zienia the Director simply told her to just keep her hands clasped, and not to point at anything.

Chapters
Sabotage
Lost in Space
The Men With Six Fingers
The Thing in the Crater
Prisoners of Venus
The Killer Virus
Kill on Sight
Attack

Cast
 Norman Wooland - Doctor Ballantyne 
 Mandy Harper - Pat
 Robin Stewart - Jim 
 Robin Hunter - Peter 
 Patrick Kavanagh - Mike 
 Arnold Diamond - Imos 
 George Pastell - Kallas 
 Ferdy Mayne - Votan 
 Jackie Martin - Borlas 
 Zienia Merton - Marla 
 Tony Calvin - Joe 
 Robert Bruce - George 
 Andrew Laurence - Colonel Armstrong 
 Robert James - Stewart

References

External links

1962 films
British science fiction films
Films directed by Ernest Morris
Films shot at Pinewood Studios
1960s English-language films
1960s British films